Herzberg (Elster) is a town in the Elbe-Elster district of the German federal state of Brandenburg.

Overview
 
From 1939 to 1945 it was home to the Deutschlandsender Herzberg/Elster, a huge longwave transmitter, whose mast was the second tallest construction in the world, at Herzberg/Elster. The basement of the mast is still there.

History
From 1815 to 1944, Herzberg was part of the Prussian Province of Saxony. From 1944 to 1945, it was part of the Province of Halle-Merseburg. From 1952 to 1990, it was part of the Bezirk Cottbus of East Germany.

Twin towns
Herzberg (Elster) is twinned with the following cities:
  Büdingen, Hesse
  Świebodzin, Poland
  Dixon,  United States of America
  Soest, Germany

People  
 Louise von François (1817-1893), narrator and writer
 Werner Janensch (1878-1969), paleontologist and geologist
 Steffen Zesner (* 1967), world class swimmer

References

External links

 

Localities in Elbe-Elster